DWNH (100.1 FM), broadcasting as 100.1 Radyo Kapalayawan, is a radio station owned and operated by the National Nutrition Council under the Nutriskwela Community Radio Network. Its studios and transmitter are located at the Pamilihang Bayan, Paluan. "Kapalayawan" stands for love in Mangyan.

References

Radio stations established in 2017
Radio stations in Mindoro